Guranabad is a village in West Azerbaijan Province, Iran.

Guranabad may also refer to:
 Guranabad-e Pashai
 Guranabad-e Qazi
 Guranabad-e Qazzaq